National Health Insurance Scheme refers to a health insurance program set up by the National government.

Existing schemes 
 National Health Insurance Scheme (Ghana)
 National Health Insurance Scheme (Nigeria)
 National Health Insurance (Japan)
 National_health_insurance#Programs Additional schemes

See also 
 NHIS (disambiguation)
 National Health Insurance